Mesosa mediofasciata is a species of beetle in the family Cerambycidae. It was described by Stephan von Breuning in 1942. It is known from Japan.

References

mediofasciata
Beetles described in 1942